Choricius of Gaza was a Gaza-based Greek sophist and rhetorician of Late Antiquity. With writings dating to the early sixth century, he flourished in the time of Anastasius I (AD 491–518) as a scholar and public orator. He is considered as part of the Rhetorical School of Gaza, of which he later became the chair.

Choricius was the pupil of Procopius of Gaza, who must be distinguished from the historian Procopius of Caesarea.

Style and works 
A number of Choricius' declamations and descriptive treatises have been preserved. The declamations, which are in many cases accompanied by explanatory commentaries, chiefly consist of panegyrics, funeral orations and the stock themes of the rhetorical schools. His wedding speeches, wishing prosperity to the bride and bridegroom, strike out a new line.

Choricius was also the author of descriptions of works of art after the manner of Philostratus. The moral maxims, which were a constant feature of his writings, were largely drawn upon by Macanus Chrysocephalas, metropolitan of Philadelphia (middle of the 14th century), in his Rodonia (rose-garden), a voluminous collection of ethical sayings.

The style of Choricius is praised by Photius as pure and elegant, but he is censured for lack of naturalness. A special feature of his style is the persistent avoidance of hiatus, peculiar to what is called the school of Gaza.

References

Further reading
Edition
Richard Foerster and Eberhard Richtsteig, Choricii Gazaei opera, Leipzig, Teubner, 1929 (repr. Stuttgart, 1972).
Translations
Fotios K. Litsas, Choricius of Gaza: An Approach to His Work.  Introduction, translation, commentary, University of Chicago dissertation, 1980.
Robert J. Penella (ed.), Rhetorical Exercises from Late Antiquity: A Translation of Choricius of Gaza's Preliminary Talks and Declamations. Cambridge: Cambridge University Press, 2009.
Secondary literature
Catherine Saliou (ed.), Gaza dans l'Antiquité Tardive: Archéologie, rhétorique et histoire. Salerno: Helios, 2005.

External links
Choricius, Orationes, declamationes, fragmenta, ed. Boissonade (1846)

Roman-era Sophists
Ancient Greek rhetoricians
5th-century births
6th-century deaths
5th-century Byzantine writers
5th-century Byzantine people
6th-century Byzantine people